Dorian Wind Quintet is an American wind quintet. Formed at Tanglewood Music Festival, Tennessee, in 1961, their repertoire includes Baroque pieces to contemporary pieces. They have released recordings on Summit, New World, and CRI Records. Members have included Catherine Ransom Karoly and Jerry Kirkbride.

They have commissioned works by composers including George Perle's Wind Quintet IV, 1986 Pulitzer Prize for Music winner. In 1981 they were the first wind quintet to appear in Carnegie Hall.

The ensemble's members are flutist Gretchen Pusch, oboist Gerard Reuter, clarinetist Benjamin Fingland, bassoonist Adrian Morejon and French hornist Karl Kramer-Johansen.

See also
Dorian mode

References

External links
http://www.DorianWindQuintet.org/
"Dorian Wind Quintet", ParkerArtists.com.
"Dorian Woodwind Quintet Foundation", NYC-Arts.org.
"The Dorian Wind Quintet", SaintPaulSunday.PublicRadio.org.
Dorian Wind Quintet records, 1954-2012 Music Division, The New York Public Library.

Wind quintets
Musical groups established in 1961
Summit Records artists
1961 establishments in Tennessee